Linda K. Hogan (born July 16, 1947) is a  poet, storyteller, academic, playwright, novelist, environmentalist and writer of short stories. 
She is currently the Chickasaw Nation's Writer in Residence. Hogan is a recipient of the Lannan Literary Award for Poetry.
She lives in Tishomingo, Oklahoma.

Early life
Linda Hogan is American, born July 16, 1947 in Denver, Colorado. Her father, Charles C. Henderson, is a Chickasaw from a recognized historical family. Her mother, Cleona Florine (Bower) Henderson was of white descent. Linda's uncle, Wesley Henderson, helped form the White Buffalo Council in Denver during the 1950s,  to help other Native American people coming to the city because of The Relocation Act, which forcibly removed Indigenous peoples for work and other opportunities. He had a strong influence on her and she grew up relating strongly to both her Chickasaw family in Native American Territory (Oklahoma) and to a mixed Native American community in the Denver area. At other times, her family traveled because of her father's career in the U.S. military. Her family lived in Germany for three years. She descended from a family of storytellers who helped shape her writing.

Career
Hogan earned a Master of Arts (M. A.) degree from the University of Colorado at Boulder in 1978 at the Colorado Springs campus. She then briefly moved to Maryland with her husband and later moved back to Colorado where she went to school in Boulder. Her first university teaching position was at Colorado College in 1980–1984, the next was in American Indian Studies and American Studies at the University of Minnesota in Minneapolis (1982-1984). Hogan started writing in her late twenties after working with orthopedically handicapped children. During her lunch hours, she would read Kenneth Rexroth's work, which gave her the confidence to start writing publicly. She kept a journal that she wrote in religiously. As she began to write essays and fiction, she realized that the energy she put into writing in a journal, had a new outlet. As she journaled, she also discovered that she was writing about the beauty of nature every morning and she believed she could do more for nature in less private writing settings After writing her first book, Calling Myself Home, she continued to write poetry.  Her work has both a historical and political focus, but is lyrical. Hogan's lyrical work is considered to have a voice of literary activism and in it is Native spirituality and indigenous knowledge systems of all genres She considers her work politically centered because it is about a world view that cannot be separated from the political. Her most recent books are The Book of Medicines (1993) and Rounding the Human Corners. (2008) and a book of new and selected poetry containing work from the 1970s until 2014. Published in 2015, Hogan also has worked with Brenda Peterson in writing, Sightings, the Mysterious Journey of the Gray Whale for National Geographic books. She also wrote the script for the PBS documentary, Everything Has a Spirit, regarding Native American religious freedom.

She is also a novelist and essayist. Her work centers on the world of native peoples, the environment, and from her own indigenous perspective. She is currently known by students of ecological literature and eco-poetics. She was a full professor of Creative Writing at the University of Colorado and then taught for two years in the University's Ethnic Studies Department. She has been a speaker at the United Nations Forum and was a plenary speaker at the Environmental Literature Conference in Turkey in 2009. Her most recent teaching has been as Writer in Residence for The Chickasaw Nation for six years, and a faculty position at the Indian Arts Institute in Santa Fe.

Hogan writes in a variety of different genres, including fiction, nonfiction, essays, and poetry. Her concentration is on environmental themes as well Southeastern tribal histories and indigenous spirits and culture. Hogan's work is distinguished by its equal attention to historical research and creative narration. For example, in her long-form poem Indios, published in 2012, Hogan combines Greek and Indigenous mythology to highlight the universal struggles of motherhood. In her second novel, Power, Hogan draws inspiration from the 1987 court case United States v. Billie, which challenged Native American political and religious sovereignty. A finalist for the International Impact Award in Ireland, Hogan's Power juxtaposes the epistemologies of Western modernity and traditional Indigenous cultures. One key way she implements contrast between the two cultures is through power itself. In western society, it is seen that whoever has a higher title, is older, etc will have more power over those in lower positions or who are younger. This is contrasted in the Indigenous cultures by Hogan introducing "Oni", the wind. Throughout the novel, the reader learns that Oni gives life to everything. Everything works off the same power, so they are all one. Everything is seen as equal power because all of the power comes from one thing, Oni. Power in western culture is materialistic unlike in the Indigenous cultures. Her use of this point of view showcases her heritage and belief in nature. She strives to balance the perception of male and female power in Native American culture that was disrupted by the effects of the early Christian White Americans. Hogan captures the intersectionality of modern generations with indigenous heritage and social equity within modern institutions. In Power, Omishto, the protagonist and narrator, grapples with listening to Taiga relatives or legends, a fictitious tribe invented by the author, and academic or modern institutions. The novel brings up important points about humanity and the role they are intended to play within nature and tradition. Oshmito is just a young girl when she is introduced to the reader, growing up as a native in an emergent and westernizing world. It seems that this character is an embodiment of Linda Hogan herself. Oshmito is wrestling with her identity with the Taiga tribe, personified through her Aunt Ama, and the modern American life, exemplified through her mother, father, and sister. The degradation of the reverence towards the Taiga people and their customs is bound to the life of Ama and when even she betrays the tribe through taking the life of a panther, her animal ally and their hallowed ancestor, all seems lost to Oshmito. This contrast of Aunt Ama’s quintessence versus her actions signals to the reader that Hogan is attempting to complicate the idea that one is not wholly native or wholly westernized—the two are not mutually exclusive. The novel also delivers an excellent portrayal of the American justice system that is sure to make the reader question some of their own values and ideas of what "justice" is. The two separate trials held within the story (the tribal council and the court hearing) both offer different perspectives on justice and have differing methods of reaching it. While Ama is essentially being tried for the same crime by each party, the severity of her actions vary drastically between the two different persecuting groups. The eventual verdicts reached by each party gives the reader insight into two different legal systems that have quite different ways of operating.

Her work, whether fiction or non-fiction, expresses an indigenous understanding of the world. She has written essays and poems on a variety of subjects, both fictional and nonfictional, biographical and from research.  Hogan has also written historical novels.  Her work studies the historical wrongs done to Native Americans and the American environment since the European colonization of North America.

Hogan was a professor at the University of Colorado at Boulder and the University of Oklahoma. Hogan is the second minority woman to become a full professor at the University of Colorado.  She is the (inaugural) Writer-in-Residence for the Chickasaw Nation in Oklahoma. 
In October 2011, she instructed a writing workshop through the Abiquiu Workshops in Abiquiú, New Mexico. She currently teaches one class a year in the graduate writing program at the University of Colorado as she keeps up with her schedule from her other work. Supporting solely herself and her home, Hogan keeps very busy but rarely works full-time because otherwise, she would not be able to write.

She has now returned to her Chickasaw homeland in Oklahoma, where she lives in Tishomingo. with her family. Hogan feels as though she owes the future to her children and grandchildren. She says that her home is a place for her grandchildren particularly because they are given the opportunity to explore nature. Along with this, she believes that tradition and language are extremely important, especially in Native American culture, which is why her family is so important to her. Her work is completely dedicated to her children.

She strives to help other writers succeed, even offering to further their careers with her insight. She teaches Creative Writing workshops, and will, on occasion, take a private client under her wing, helping them to edit, write, or complete their works.

Personal life
Along with being an author, Hogan is also an environmentalist who spent eight years volunteering at a wildlife rehabilitation center. Two out of those eight years were spent at veterinarian school and the other six were spent at Birds of Prey Rehabilitation Center in Colorado. The work was very physical so Hogan reached a point where she was no longer able to handle it. Now, she does good for animals by talking and writing about them Hogan married Pat Hogan and had children, Sandra Dawn Protector and Tanya Thunder Horse.

Awards and recognition
2016 Throreau Prize from PEN
Native Arts and Cultures Foundation 2015 National Artist Fellowship
Mountains and Plains Booksellers Spirit of the West Literary Achievement Award, 2007
Inducted into the Chickasaw Hall of Fame in 2007
Writer of the Year (Creative Prose), Wordcraft Circle Award, 2002
Lifetime Achievement Award, Native Writers' Circle of the Americas, 1998
Colorado Book Award, 1996
Colorado Book Award
Solar Storms (1996)
The Book of Medicines  (1993)
Lannan Award, 1994, for Outstanding Achievement in Poetry
Oklahoma Book Award for Fiction, 1991 (Mean Spirit)
Guggenheim Fellow, 1991
Finalist, Pulitzer Prize for Literature, 1991.
American Book Award, Before Columbus Foundation, 1986
Stand magazine Fiction Award, 1983
Five Civilized Tribes Play Writing Award, 1980
Finalist for the National Book Critics Circle Award for The Book of Medicines

Bibliography
 Dark, Sweet: New and Selected Poems, Coffee House Press, 2014
 Indios, poems, Wings Press 2012 
 The Inner Journey: Views from Native Traditions (ed.) Morning Light Press, 2009, 
 Rounding the Human Corners: Poems, Coffee House Press, 2008, 
 People of the Whale: A Novel; W. W. Norton & Company, 2009, 
 ; W. W. Norton & Company, 2002, 
 The Sweet Breathing of Plants: Women and the Green World, 2000; North Point Press, 2001, 
 ; W. W. Norton & Company, 1999, 
 ; Simon and Schuster, 1996, 
Hogan, Linda (1999). Power. New York. p. 58. .
 ; Simon and Schuster, 1997, 
 The book of medicines: poems, Coffee House Press, 1993, 
 Red Clay: Poems and Stories, Greenfield Review Press, 1991, 
 Mean Spirit, Atheneum, 1990, 
 
 
 Eclipse, American Indian Studies Center, University of California, 1983, 
 Daughters, I Love You, Research Center on Women, 1981
 A Piece of Moon (1981)
 Calling Myself Home, Greenfield Review Press, 1978

Criticism
Dennis, Helen M. Native American Literature: Towards a Spatialized Reading. London, Routledge 2006. pp. 61–85.

In Anthology
Melissa Tuckey, ed. Ghost Fishing: An Eco-Justice Poetry Anthology. University of Georgia Press, 2018.

See also

List of writers from peoples indigenous to the Americas
Native American Renaissance
Native American Studies

References

External links

Bibliography and links to other online resources
Page containing an audio clip of Hogan reading
Profile at "Writers on the Edge"
Linda Hogan's web page
In Depth interview with Hogan, July 3, 2011

1947 births
Living people
20th-century American dramatists and playwrights
20th-century American novelists
21st-century American novelists
20th-century American poets
21st-century American poets
20th-century American women writers
21st-century American women writers
20th-century Native Americans
21st-century Native Americans
Chickasaw people
American Book Award winners
American environmentalists
American storytellers
Women storytellers
American women dramatists and playwrights
American women environmentalists
American women novelists
American women poets
Native American dramatists and playwrights
Native American environmentalists
Native American novelists
Native American poets
Native American women writers
Novelists from Colorado
Novelists from Oklahoma
People from Denver
People from Tishomingo, Oklahoma
Poets from Colorado
Poets from Oklahoma
20th-century Native American women
21st-century Native American women
Native American people from Colorado